Zonbalan (also romanized as Zonbalān and known as Zombelān; Assyrian Neo-Aramaic: romanized as Zomalan) is a village in Nazlu-e Shomali Rural District, Nazlu District, Urmia County, West Azerbaijan Province, Iran. At the 2006 census, its population was 127, in 37 families.

History 
The village had a significant Assyrian community. One church remains extant in the village, that of Mar Aprim, and the village was known for its shara (festival) of Mar Aprim.

See also
 Assyrians in Iran
 List of Assyrian settlements

References 

Populated places in Urmia County
Assyrian settlements